Andrew Kajjo (born 4 September 1948) is a Ugandan boxer. He competed in the men's welterweight event at the 1968 Summer Olympics.

References

1948 births
Living people
Ugandan male boxers
Olympic boxers of Uganda
Boxers at the 1968 Summer Olympics
Sportspeople from Kampala
Welterweight boxers